"Just Be" is a song by Tiësto, featuring British singer and songwriter Kirsty Hawkshaw.

Overview
With its first appearance being the title track of Tiësto's album Just Be, the song was released as the album's third single on 11 October 2004. The single was promoted with a remix by Antillas, which also became the selected track for the official music video. Antillas' remix was also the featured radio promo, while the original version of the song remained exclusive to the album. The Antillas' remix was made popular by John Garabedian, host of the syndicated Open House Party, as a frequent close out song to his program which he still plays to this present day.

The song was eventually reissued under a new title, "Just Be Me", produced by Jimmy Gomez. The alternative production made its debut on the 2004 drama series soundtrack Nip/Tuck: Original TV Soundtrack, compiled by American DJ duo Gabriel & Dresden. It eventually saw a second appearance the following year, being featured as the opening track on Kirsty Hawkshaw's second album, Meta-Message, released on 10 October 2004.

Official versions
 "Just Be - 514 Mix" – 8:49
 "Just Be - Antillas Club Mix" – 9:49
 "Just Be - Antillas Radio Edit" – 3:13
 "Just Be - Antillas Dub" – 9:19
 "Just Be - Antillas Edit Mix" – 4:10
 "Just Be - Wally Lopez la Factoria Vocal Remix" – 8:49
 "Just Be - Wally Lopez la Factoria Dub Remix" – 8:52

Formats and track listings

CD, Maxi Singles
Australia Maxi-single
 "Just Be - 514 Mix" – 8:49
 "Just Be - Antillas Club Mix" – 9:49
 "Just Be - Antillas Radio Cut" – 3:13
 "Just Be - Antillas Dub Mix" – 9:19
 "Just Be - Antillas Edit Mix" – 4:10
 "Just Be - Wally Lopez Vocal Mix" – 8:59
 "Just Be - Wally Lopez Dub" – 8:51
 "Ancient History" – 8:43

Netherlands Maxi-single
 "Just Be - Antillas Radio Edit" – 3:13
 "Just Be - Antillas Club Mix" – 9:49
 "Just Be - 514 Mix" – 8:42
 "Just Be - Wally Lopez la Factoria Vocal Remix" – 8:57
 "Ancient History" – 8:43

United Kingdom Maxi-single
 "Just Be - Antillas Radio Edit" – 3:13
 "Just Be - Antillas Club Mix" – 9:47
 "Just Be - 514 Mix" – 8:41
 "Just Be - Wally Lopez la Factoria Vocal Remix" – 8:52
 "Just Be - Antillas Dub" – 9:18

United States Maxi-single
 "Just Be - Antillas Club Mix" – 9:52
 "Just Be - 514 Mix" – 8:45
 "Just Be - Wally Lopez la Factoria Dub Remix" – 8:52
 "Ancient History" – 8:42

United States Maxi-single
 "Just Be - Antillas Radio Cut" – 3:13
 "Just Be - 514 Mix" – 8:42
 "Just Be - Wally Lopez La Factoria Vocal Remix" – 8:57
 "Just Be - Antillas Club Mix" – 9:49
 "Just Be - Antillas Club Dub" – 9:19
 "Just Be - Wally Lopez la Factoria Dub Remix" – 8:52
 "Ancient History" – 8:42

12" Vinyl

Magik Muzik, Media Records, Kontor Records 12" Vinyl
 "Just Be - Antillas Club Mix" – 9:49
 "Ancient History"  – 8:43

Nebula 12" Vinyl
 "Just Be - Antillas Club Mix" – 9:49
 "Just Be - 514 Mix" – 8:41

S2 Records 12" Vinyl
 "Just Be - Antillas Club Mix" – 9:47
 "Just Be - Wally Lopez Dub" – 8:51
 "Just Be - 514 Mix" – 8:41

Kontor Records, Electropolis, Magik Muzik 12" Vinyl
 "Just Be – 514 Mix" – 8:49
 "Just Be - Wally Lopez la Factoria Dub Remix" – 8:52

Electropolis 12" Vinyl
 "Just Be - Antillas Club Mix" – 9:49
 "Ancient History" – 8:42

Wally Lopez Remixes
 "Just Be - Wally Lopez la Factoria Vocal Remix" – 8:49
 "Just Be - Wally Lopez -a Factoria Dub Remix" – 8:52

Charts

Weekly charts

Year-end charts

Release history

References

Tiësto songs
2004 singles
Songs written by Judie Tzuke
Songs written by Tiësto
2004 songs